The Battle of Giria were two battles that took place in Giria, an insignificant census town in Bengal, although not well known, were very significant in the history of Bengal and like the Battle of Plassey, had far reaching consequences.

Location

It falls in the modern day district of Murshidabad in the state of West Bengal, India.

The Battles

Background 
Alivardi Khan the then Subahdar of Azimabad was not satisfied with the position of Governor and had always harboured ambitions of becoming the Nawab of Bengal and had real ambitions of deposing Sarfaraz Khan. He was willingly aided and abetted in this treacherous activity by his brother Haji Ahmed.

To effect this, he required an imperial commission directed to himself, empowering him to wrest the three provinces out of the hands of the present viceroy, Sarfaraz Khan. After having dispatched these letters, he gave out that he intended marching against the zamindars of Bhojpur, and under that pretence he mustered his troops, which he always kept in constant readiness. At the same time, he had the art to give Sarfaraz Khan public notice of his project, though he in reality waited ready to avail himself of the first opportunity to effect his true purpose.

Eventually, ten months after Nadir Shah's departure for Persia, and just thirteen months after Shuja-ud-Din Muhammad Khan's death, he received the imperial commission, drawn up in the style he had requested. Being now resolved on marching against Sarfaraz Khan, he wrote secretly to Jagat Seth Fateh Chand that on a certain day he would commence his march. In March 1740; Alivardi Khan, set out for Murshidabad, on the context of expedition to Bhojpur, and encamped at some distance from the city of Patna.

Alivardi Khan, in a message to Sarfaraz Khan, suggested that he was not marching on him but was arriving to pay homage to the Nawab. Initially satisfied, Sarfaraz Khan eventually decided to march on the head of his army and arrived at the town of Comrah on 9 April 1740. Alivardi, in the interim, secured the Teliagarhi pass and camped at Rajmahal. The Nawab's army was being led by a seasoned general, Ghaus Khan. Ray-Rayan, and Alam Chand also accompanied him. The rebel army was being led by Alivardi Khan with Nandalal and Nawazish Muhammad Khan as his deputies.

They opposing armies marched on to Giria (Battle of Giria), a village on the banks of the river Bhagirathi for a showdown on 26 April 1740.

The Second Battle of Giria, 1763

On the first of August, the Bengal Army crossed their way through the Bansli river and the following day was the start of the Second Battle of Giria against Mir Kasem's army. The battle was about a mile from the village of Giria. After his losses in Catwa, Mir Kasem was determined to fight a decisive battle and assembled his troops at Suti. This position was naturally strong and artificial as entrenchments covered the whole front. Mir Kasem had superior numbers and highly efficient troops than the English as their left flank was being met with heavy cavalry forces. This attack was headed by Mir Badr ud din who managed to drive the battalion into the Bansali river. This gap in the Bengal Army's formation left their 84th Regiment to be attacked from the front and back.

Major Adams would bring up reserves from Major Carnac, who was handling the right wing and managed to send reinforcements to them. The 84th freed themselves from Mir Badr ud din's cavalry troops and recovered their guns. With Mir Badr ud din getting wounded in battle and his troops weakened, Adams seized the opportunity and charged in for another attack. The exchange would result in a victory for Major Adams but at a heavy loss and the English were still pushed back.

References

Giria
Bengal Subah
1740 in India
1763 in India
Giria
Giria
Giria